In visual perception, the near point is the closest point at which an object can be placed and still form a focused image on the retina, within the eye's accommodation range. The other limit to the eye's accommodation range is the far point.

The near point is highly age dependent (see  accommodation). A person with hyperopia or presbyopia would have a near point that is farther than normal.

Sometimes, near point is given in diopters (see ), which refers to the inverse of the distance.

Vision correction 
A person with hyperopia has a near point that is further away than the typical near point for someone their age, and hence the person is unable to bring an object at the typical near point distance into sharp focus. A corrective lens can be used to correct hyperopia by imaging an object at the typical near point distance  onto a virtual image at the patient's actual near point, at distance . From the thin lens formula, the required lens will have optical power  given by

The calculation can be further improved by taking into account the distance between the spectacle lens and the human eye, which is usually about 1.5 cm:

References

Ophthalmology